is a Japanese illustrator from Tokushima Prefecture, Japan, though now lives in Tokyo. As of 2007, Yasu is a freelance illustrator.

Works
Light novels
Koe de Bakasete yo Baby
Oto × Maho
Phantom
Reverse Brad
Toradora!
Watashitachi no Tamura-kun
Yūkyū Tenbōdai no Kai
Mayoi Neko Overrun! (vol.10)

Game character design
Chaos Wars
Lisa to Isshoni Tairikuōdan!: A-Train de Ikō
Spectral Glories
The Promise of Haruhi Suzumiya (assistant)

Manga
Itsukasei Metsubō Syndrome
Dōbutsu no Meido-san
Joshiraku (story by Kōji Kumeta)
Hokkenshitsu
Mangirl! (character design)
Nankuru Neesan (story by Kōji Kumeta)

Anime character design
Mangirl! (Original Anime Character Design)
OtherHayate the Combat Butler Trading Card Game''

External links
Yasu's personal website 

1984 births
Japanese artists
Manga artists from Tokushima Prefecture
Living people